The 11th Annual NFL Honors was an awards presentation by the National Football League that honored its players from the 2021 NFL season. It was held on February 10, 2022, at YouTube Theater in the SoFi Entertainment District in Los Angeles. Keegan-Michael Key hosted the NFL honors for his second time. This is the first presentation where it was held on a Thursday instead of a Saturday and was aired for the first time on ESPN/ ABC and NFL Network (with ESPN+ streaming the ceremony, making the first time that the ceremony has ever been available on a streaming platform) as that year's Super Bowl broadcaster, NBC, carried the 2022 Winter Olympics.

List of award winners

References

NFL Honors 011
2021 National Football League season
2022 in American football